Eric D. Patterson, Ph.D. is an American political scientist whose work focuses on international relations, just war theory, and the intersection of religion and public policy. His advanced degrees are from the University of California, Santa Barbara and the University of Wales at Aberystwyth. He serves as President of the Religious Freedom Institute in Washington, DC.  Previously he was Dean and Professor of the Robertson School of Government at Regent University and before that he worked at Georgetown University's Berkley Center for Religion, Peace, & World Affairs. His government experience includes service as an Air National Guard officer, the White House Fellowship, and time as a William C. Foster Fellow working at the U.S. State Department's Bureau of Political-Military Affairs.  His academic articles have appeared in Public Integrity, Journal of Military Ethics, Survival, International Studies Perspectives, International Journal of Religious Freedom, Democracy and Society, Journal of Human Security, International Journal of Applied Philosophy, International Politics, Foreign Policy Journal, International Journal of Intelligence and Counterintelligence, Journal of Political Science, Journal for the Scientific Study of Religion, and Security Studies.

Books
Just War Historian: The Legacy of James Turner Johnson. Co-edited with Tim Demy and Gina Granados Palmer. (Stone Tower Books, forthcoming 2023).
Power Politics and Moral Order: Three Generations of Christian Realism (A reader). Co-edited with Robert Joustra. (Wipf & Stock, 2022). 
Just War and Christian Tradition: Christian Denominations and the Ethics of Security and Peace. Co-edited with J. Daryl Charles (University of Notre Dame Press, 2022).
Just American Wars: Ethical Dilemmas in U.S. Military History. (2019).
Philosophers on War. Co-edited with Timothy Demy (2017).
The Reagan Manifesto: “A Time For Choosing” and Its Influence. Co-edited with Jeffry Morrison (2016).
Ashgate Companion on Military Ethics.  Co-edited with James Turner Johnson (2015).
Military Chaplains in Afghanistan, Iraq, and Beyond (2014).
Ethics Beyond War’s End (2012).
Ending Wars Well: Just War Theory in Post-Conflict (2012).
Politics in a Religious World: Building a Religiously Informed US Foreign Policy (2011).
Debating the War of Ideas.  Co-edited with John Gallagher (2009).
Christianity and Power Politics Today: Christian Realism and Contemporary Political Dilemmas (2008).
Just War Thinking: Morality & Pragmatism in the Struggle Against 21st Century Conflicts (2007).
Latin America’s New-Reformation: Religion’s Influence on Politics (2005).
The Christian Realists: Reassessing the Contribution of Niebuhr and His Contemporaries (2004).

See also
Just war theory
US department of state
Bureau of Political-Military Affairs

External links
 https://www.regent.edu/acad/schgov/faculty/patterson/
 https://berkleycenter.georgetown.edu/people/eric-patterson

Year of birth missing (living people)
Living people
American political scientists
Alumni of the University of Wales
University of California, Santa Barbara alumni
Regent University faculty
Georgetown University faculty